William Karush (1 March 1917 – 22 February 1997) was an American professor of mathematics at California State University at Northridge and was a mathematician best known for his contribution to Karush–Kuhn–Tucker conditions. In his master's thesis he was the first to publish these necessary conditions for the inequality-constrained problem, although he became renowned after a seminal conference paper by Harold W. Kuhn and Albert W. Tucker. He also worked as a physicist for the Manhattan Project, although he signed the Szilárd petition and became a peace activist afterwards.

Selected works
 Webster's New World Dictionary of Mathematics, MacMillan Reference Books, Revised edition (April 1989), 
 On the Maximum Transform and Semigroups of Transformations (1962), Richard Bellman, William Karush,
 The crescent dictionary of mathematics, general editor (1962) William Karush, Oscar Tarcov
 Isoperimetric problems & index theorems. (1942), William Karush, Thesis (Ph.D.) University of Chicago, Department of Mathematics.
 Minima of functions of several variables with inequalities as side conditions, William Karush. (1939), Thesis (M.S.) – University of Chicago, 1939.

See also
 Karush–Kuhn–Tucker conditions
 Szilárd petition

References

External links

1917 births
1997 deaths
20th-century American mathematicians
California State University, Northridge faculty
University of Chicago alumni
Manhattan Project people
20th-century American physicists
Mathematical physicists
Activists from Chicago
American anti-war activists